Jonathan Ruiz Llaga (born 2 April 1982) is a Spanish footballer who plays for Puente Genil FC as a midfielder.

Club career
Ruiz was born in Écija, Andalusia. In a 18-year professional career, he spent six seasons in the Segunda División, playing a total of 215 matches for Sevilla Atlético and SD Ponferradina and scoring five goals for the latter club.

In June 2018, the 36-year-old Ruiz moved to the Tercera División, signing with Puente Genil FC in his native region.

References

External links

1982 births
Living people
People from Écija
Sportspeople from the Province of Seville
Spanish footballers
Footballers from Andalusia
Association football midfielders
Segunda División players
Segunda División B players
Tercera División players
Tercera Federación players
Écija Balompié players
Sevilla Atlético players
SD Ponferradina players